Ihor Ivanovych Umansky (born 9 January 1975) is a Ukrainian economist and civil servant. On 4 March 2020, he was appointed as the Minister of Finance of Ukraine. He was dismissed on 30 March 2020. Umansky claims he never received a formal reason for his dismissal and that he first heard of it through news reports.

Biography 
In 1997, Umansky graduated from Kyiv National Economic University. Candidate of Economic Sciences (2012).

He held positions in the Ministry of Economy, the National Bank and UkrTransNafta.

From 2008 to 2010, he served as First Deputy Minister of Finance.

From 2014 to 2015, he again worked as First Deputy Minister of Finance.

From 2016 to 2019, Umansky was an adviser to the President of Ukraine.

Adviser to the Head of the Office of the President of Ukraine (2020).

See also 
 Second Tymoshenko government
 Shmyhal Government

References

External links 
 

1975 births
Living people
People from Pripyat
Kyiv National Economic University alumni
Ukrainian civil servants
Finance ministers of Ukraine
Presidential advisors
21st-century  Ukrainian economists
21st-century Ukrainian politicians
National Security and Defense Council of Ukraine
Independent politicians in Ukraine